Asif Kottayil (born 24 May 1985 in Trikaripur, Kasaragod) is an Indian footballer who plays as a central midfielder for Mohun Bagan in the I-League.

Career

Prayag United
After playing college football at Payyanur College, Asif was signed by Malabar United of the I-League 2nd Division for the 2008 season. After two seasons with Malabar, Asif was signed by Prayag United who were then known as Chirag United, where he made just the one appearance in one season.

Chirag United Kerala
After one season at Chirag United, Asif joined Chirag United Club Kerala after Chirag Group who were sponsors of Chirag United dropped their sponsorship of the Kolkata club and took over Viva Kerala, renaming the Kerala-based club as Chirag United Kerala. He only stayed at the club for one season however scoring once in nineteen appearances.

Back to Prayag United
On 11 May 2012 it was announced that Asif had re-signed for Prayag United for the 2012–13 I-League season.
In first season he played 24 I-League matches and scored a one goal.

Career statistics

Club

References

Indian footballers
Living people
1985 births
People from Kasaragod district
Footballers from Kerala
I-League players
Chirag United Club Kerala players
United SC players
Association football midfielders